Cross Inn is a settlement in Carmarthenshire on the A4066 between St Clears and Laugharne.

Villages in Carmarthenshire